Isabelle Champmoreau (born February 19, 1975) is a New Caledonian politician who serves as the Vice President of the Government of New Caledonia. She is a member of The Rally-UMP, and served in the government of Harold Martin. She is a teacher by profession.

Career
Champmoreau was municipal councilor of Nouméa from 2001 under Jean Lèques and later saved as deputy mayor.  Elected to the government of Thierry Santa in 2019, she is the only woman serving in the 17th government and is in charge of education, disability, the family, the fight against intra-family violence and animal welfare.

References

1975 births
Living people
Vice presidents of the Government of New Caledonia
Members of the Congress of New Caledonia
The Rally (New Caledonia) politicians
New Caledonian women in politics
21st-century French women politicians